The Oral Roberts Golden Eagles men's soccer team represents Oral Roberts University in NCAA Division I men's college soccer competitions. The Eagles compete in The Summit League.

Rivalries
Historically, Oral Roberts' biggest rivals have been Kansas City and Tulsa due to the geographic proximity of the two schools.

Tulsa derby
Oral Roberts' crosstown rivalry is with the Tulsa Golden Hurricane men's soccer program. Tulsa leads the series 21–2–1.

References

External links 
 

 
Soccer clubs in Oklahoma
1988 establishments in Oklahoma